Janet Sue Fender is an American physicist. She is the Scientific Adviser to the Commander, Air Combat Command, Langley Air Force Base, Virginia, USA. She was president of the Optical Society of America in 1997.

Education 
Fender was awarded a BSc in physics and astronomy by the University of Oklahoma in 1973. She went on to gain a Masters and a PhD in optical sciences at the University of Arizona.

Career 
Following graduation from Arizona, Fender joined the Air Force Weapons Laboratory at Kirtland Air Force Base, New Mexico. She rose to become Chief Scientist for Space Vehicles and Senior Scientist for Advanced Imaging at the laboratory in 1997. In 2004 she was appointed Scientific Adviser to the Commander at Air Combat Command, Langley Air Force Base, Virginia.

Awards 

 Presidential Distinguished Service Rank Award (2015)
 Fellow of the Optical Society of America (1994)
 Fellow of the International Society of Optical Engineers (1988)
 Distinguished Alumni, University of Oklahoma (2009)
 Distinguished Alumni, University of Arizona
 Sigma Pi Sigma (National Physics Honor Society)
 Gold, Silver, Bronze Corporate Cup athletic medals
 Air Force Scientific Achievement Award
 American Defense Preparedness Association Crozier Prize
 Coty Most Extraordinary American Woman of the Year
 New Mexico Federal Woman of the Year
 Who's Who Worldwide, Science and Engineering, Fourth Edition
 Coyote Classic Rally Navigator Award
 International Commission on Optics Awards
 Special Act Award, U.S. Air Force

See also
Optical Society of America

References

External links
 
 Articles Published by early OSA Presidents  Journal of the Optical Society of America

Presidents of Optica (society)
21st-century American physicists
Living people
American women physicists
Year of birth missing (living people)
21st-century American women scientists